The 2006 Western Carolina Catamounts team represented Western Carolina University as a member of the Southern Conference (SoCon) during the 2006 NCAA Division I FCS football season. Led by fifth-year head coach Kent Briggs, the Catamounts compiled an overall record of 2–9 with a mark of 0–7 in conference play, placing last out of eight teams in the SoCon. Western Carolina played their home games at Bob Waters Field at E. J. Whitmire Stadium in Cullowhee, North Carolina.

Schedule

References

Western Carolina
Western Carolina Catamounts football seasons
Western Carolina Catamounts football